Remember June is the third studio album by Australian Idol 2006 winner Damien Leith. It was released by Sony BMG in Australia on 9 October 2009. The first single from the album was To Get To You.

Track listing
 "Remember June" – 2:07
 "Golden Line" – 4:07
 "To Get To You" – 3:35
 "Wouldn't Change a Thing" – 4:03
 "Don't Give Up" – 4:00
 "Stay" – 3:06
 "Forgive, Forget" – 3:32
 "See You Again" – 3:29
 "Sorry" – 3:22
 "Unordinary World" – 4:02
 "Goodnight" – 5:07
 "For All of Time" – 3:26

Charts
Remember June debuted and peaked on the ARIA charts at number 25, and spent 2 weeks in the Top 50.

Weekly charts

Album Launch
To celebrate the release of the album, two album launch shows were held, one in the State Theatre, Sydney on 16 October 2009 and one in Thornbury Theatre, Melbourne on 17 October 2009. Both shows received positive reviews.

References

2009 albums
Damien Leith albums
Sony Music Australia albums